Christos Kallis (born 7 April 1998) is a Cypriot football player. who plays for Karmiotissa Polemidion

Club career
He made his Cypriot First Division debut for Alki Oroklini on 15 October 2017 in a game against Olympiakos Nicosia.

References

External links
 
 Christos Kallis at CFA

1998 births
Living people
Cypriot footballers
Cyprus youth international footballers
APOEL FC players
Alki Oroklini players
Digenis Oroklinis players
Cypriot First Division players
Cypriot Second Division players
Place of birth missing (living people)
Association football midfielders